This is a list of diplomatic missions in Kazakhstan. At present, the capital, Astana, hosts 69 embassies.

Diplomatic missions in Astana

Embassies

Other Posts
 (Delegation)

Gallery

Consulates General/Consulates

Almaty

 (Consulate)
  
 (Consulate)

Aktau
 (Consulate)
 (Consulate)
 
 (Consulate)

Oral
 (Consulate)

Non-Resident Embassies
Resident in Moscow, Russia:

From Other Locations:

 (Tashkent)
 (Ankara)
 (New Delhi)
 (Colombo)
 (Valletta)
 (Ankara)
 (Tehran) 
 (Singapore)
 (Berlin)
 (Ankara)
 (Canberra)

Embassies to open

See also
 Foreign relations of Kazakhstan

References

Kazakhstan Diplomatic List

Diplomatic missions in Kazakhstan
Diplomatic missions
Kazakhstan